Baaje Ghungroo is a 1962 Hindi film.

Soundtrack
"Aankhe Dhundha Rahi Hain Tumko" - N/A
"Baaje Ghungroo Chhana Chhan Chhan" - Mohammed Rafi, Sabita Chowdhury, Seeta Agarwal
"Be-Sahaara Chodkar O Janewaale" - N/A
"Jaane De Sainya Na Bahiya Marod" - N/A
"Sari Raat Jagi" - Asha Bhosle
"Preet Bhai Aisi" - Asha Bhosle
"Jara Murali Baja De Mere Shyam" - Sabita Chowdhury

References

External links
 

1962 films
1960s Hindi-language films